Jimmie Dorsey (born August 28, 1940) is an American former sports shooter. He competed in the 50 metre pistol event at the 1972 Summer Olympics.

References

1940 births
Living people
American male sport shooters
Olympic shooters of the United States
Shooters at the 1972 Summer Olympics
Sportspeople from San Diego
Pan American Games medalists in shooting
Pan American Games gold medalists for the United States
Shooters at the 1975 Pan American Games
Shooters at the 1979 Pan American Games
20th-century American people
21st-century American people